Hyporthodus is a genus of marine ray-finned fish, groupers from the subfamily Epinephelinae, part of the family Serranidae, which also includes the anthias and sea basses. It contains the following species, most of which were previously placed in Epinephelus:

Hyporthodus acanthistius (Gilbert, 1892)
Hyporthodus ergastularius (Whitley, 1930)
Hyporthodus exsul (Fowler, 1944)
Hyporthodus flavolimbatus (Poey, 1865)
Hyporthodus haifensis (Ben-Tuvia, 1953)
Hyporthodus mystacinus (Poey, 1852)
Hyporthodus nigritus (Holbrook, 1855)
Hyporthodus niphobles (Gilbert & Starks, 1897)
Hyporthodus niveatus (Valenciennes, 1828)
Hyporthodus octofasciatus (Griffin, 1926)
Hyporthodus perplexus (Randall, Hoese & Last, 1991)
Hyporthodus quernus (Seale, 1901)
Hyporthodus septemfasciatus (Thunberg, 1793)

A molecular analysis has shown that most species of Hyporthodus can be identified on the basis of COI barcoding sequences.

References

External links
 
 

 
Epinephelini